Caloptilia clastopetra is a moth of the family Gracillariidae. It is known from India (Karnataka and Maharashtra).

The larvae feed on Clerodendron infortunatum. They mine the leaves of their host plant.

References

clastopetra
Moths described in 1928
Moths of Asia